Manuel Esteves Soeiro Vasques (17 March 1909 – February 1977), known as Soeiro, was a Portuguese footballer who played as a striker.

Club career
Born in Barreiro, Setúbal District, Soeiro signed for Sporting CP in 1933 from local Luso Futebol Clube. During his 12-year spell with the former club, he helped to the conquest of four Taça de Portugal trophies – the competition was known as Campeonato de Portugal until 1938 – and the 1940–41 edition of the Primeira Liga. Additionally, he was the latter tournament's top scorer in 1934–35 and 1936–37.

Soeiro appeared in 219 games for Sporting in all competitions, scoring 206 goals.

International career
Soeiro earned 12 caps for the Portugal national team in nearly nine years. He made his debut on 3 May 1932 in a friendly against Yugoslavia, netting once in the 3–2 win in Lisbon.

Personal life
Soeiro's nephew, Manuel Vasques, was also a footballer. He too played for Sporting and Portugal.

References

External links

1909 births
1977 deaths
Sportspeople from Barreiro, Portugal
Portuguese footballers
Association football forwards
Primeira Liga players
Sporting CP footballers
Portugal international footballers